Masala is a village of 5,855 inhabitants in Kirkkonummi municipality. It is located in the western Uusimaa region, in southern Finland, just outside the Helsinki Metropolitan Area. Masala railway station, a station on the Helsinki commuter rail network is located in Masala. The Finnish Geodetic Institute also is located there.

Villages in Finland
Kirkkonummi